Light is an unincorporated community in Greene County, Arkansas, United States. Light has a post office with ZIP code 72439.

The community is named after Daniel Light, a first settler.

Climate
The climate is characterized by relatively high temperatures and evenly distributed precipitation throughout the year. The Köppen Climate Classification subtype for this climate is "Cfa" (Humid Subtropical Climate).
<div style="width:65%">

</div style>

References

Unincorporated communities in Greene County, Arkansas
Unincorporated communities in Arkansas